Chatchai Budprom (born February 4, 1987) is a Thai professional footballer who plays as a goalkeeper for Thai League 1 club BG Pathum United and the Thailand national team.

International career

Chatchai was called up several times by Thailand's former coach Winfried Schäfer. In 2013, he debuted for Thailand in a friendly match against Bhutan. Chatchai also played in the 2013 King's Cup against North Korea. In 2013 Chatchai was called up to the national team by Surachai Jaturapattarapong to the 2015 AFC Asian Cup qualification. In May 2015, he was called up to Thailand to play in the 2018 FIFA World Cup qualification (AFC) against Vietnam.

Chatchai was the first choice keeper for Thailand in the 2020 AFF Championship. However, he suffered an injury sidelining him for 8 months, while playing against Vietnam in the second leg of the semi-finals of the tournament.

Honours

Club
Chiangrai United
 Thai FA Cup (2): 2017, 2018
 Thailand Champions Cup (1): 2018
 Thai League Cup (1): 2018
BG Pathum United
 Thai League 1 (1): 2020–21
 Thai League 2 (1): 2019
 Thailand Champions Cup (1): 2021

International
Thailand
 AFF Championship (1): 2020

Individual
Thai League 1 Best XI: 2020–21

References

External links
Chatchai Budprom at Soccerway

1982 births
Living people
Chatchai Budprom
Chatchai Budprom
Association football goalkeepers
Chatchai Budprom
Chatchai Budprom
Chatchai Budprom
Chatchai Budprom
Chatchai Budprom
Chatchai Budprom
Chatchai Budprom
2019 AFC Asian Cup players